Drenov Grič is a settlement northeast of Vrhnika in the Inner Carniola region of Slovenia.

References

External links
Drenov Grič on Geopedia

Populated places in the Municipality of Vrhnika